Ramage & Ferguson was a Scottish shipbuilder active from 1877 to 1934, who specialised in luxury steam-yachts usually with steel hulls and timber decks. They also made several notable windjammers including the stunning five-masted København.

History

The company was formed in May 1877 in the outer harbour area of the Water of Leith on the west side of the Shore in Leith, backing onto the then relatively new Victoria Dock. Ships were launched into the Water of Leith, greatly limiting the maximum size of ship capable of launch. Production moved from iron to steel in 1880 and major expansions were made in 1892. The company quickly gained a reputation for creating luxury steam yachts for the rich and famous. They also made tramp steamers and various mid-sized vessels for East India service.

The "Ferguson" of Ramage & Ferguson is elusive and appears to have been a silent (and anonymous) partner. Probably the funder of the venture, there is some indication that Ferguson may have been Robert McNair Ferguson or connected to him in some way.

In the First World War the company made two hospital ships for the Admiralty.

In 1918 their yard manager, Henry Robb, left to form his own rival shipbuilding company.

Ramage & Ferguson got into financial difficulty in 1934 and was bought over by Henry Robb & Sons, an existing shipbuilder in Leith, as a secondary yard. The yard was used up until the 1970s and cleared of buildings in 1985. The slipway remained intact until around 1995 when it was built over to form a section of the Water of Leith Walkway. The position is still visible from the eastern bank.

Richard Ramage
He was born on 28 June 1834 in or near Glasgow.

He was apprenticed to William Denny and Brothers in Dumbarton around 1848, where he learnt his skills as a shipbuilder. In 1877 he moved to Edinburgh and founded Ramage & Ferguson. The identity of Ferguson is elusive.

In 1900 he was living at The Hawthorns, 212 Ferry Road in Leith. By this time he had retired and passed the business to his son, Alexander Gulliland Ramage.

He died on 16 July 1920 and is buried in Warriston Cemetery. The grave lies on the sloping diagonal path leading from the lower vaults to the now-sealed eastern entrance.

Alexander Gulliland Ramage
He is thought to have been born in or near Glasgow around 1870. He was the son of Richard Ramage and his wife, Elizabeth Ogilvie Gulliland (b.1836).

He took over from his father Richard Ramage as partner and managing director of Ramage & Ferguson around 1895. His younger brother John Thomson Ramage (1885-1933) acted as his assistant and design engineer.

In 1899 he was elected a fellow of the Royal Society of Edinburgh. His proposers were Bruce Peebles, Ralph Stockman, Robert McNair Ferguson, and Sir Francis Grant Ogilvie. At this time he lived at 9 Derby Street in the Newhaven district of Edinburgh.

By 1910 he was living in a larger house at 8 Western Terrace in Edinburgh's West End.

He lived at Lochcote Cottage near Torphichen.

He was author of "The Dynamics of Thought and Impulse" (1924)

He died at Lochcote Cottage on 21 February 1954.

Ships of Note
see
SS Craigrownie (1881),  wrecked 2 months after launch
SS Craigallion (1881) later renamed SS Ozama with a very colourful history in USA
SY Mount Carmel (1883), wrecked on Florida coast in 1916
SY Merrie England (1883)
SPWS Henry Vinn (1885) paddle steamer
SS Castor (1886) three-masted barque for John S. Croudace of Dundee, sold to G. Gordon & Co in 1895 broken up in 1911
Crown of India (1886) an attractive 4-masted barque sunk by a U-boat in 1915
SY Rondine (1887) for Prince Serignano of Naples, later renamed SY Sultana when sold to King Leopold II, King of the Belgians
SS Fatshan for the China Navigation Company, scrapped 1933
SS Ancona (1888) for Currie Line of Leith, sunk by a U-boat in 1915
SS Ravenna (1888) sister ship to the Ancona for the Currie Line, sunk by a U-boat in 1917
SS Weimar (1889) ironically-named steam packer for the Currie Line, scrapped 1933
SS Zamora (1889) sister ship to SS Weimar
SS Orion (1890) built as a sister to Castor for John S. Croudace, sold to J. Wilson in 1895, wrecked 1906
SS Trade Winds (1891) renamed SS Magdalene in 1899 and renamed Ophelia in 1914 
SS Procyon (1892) for John S. Croudace, sold to J. Wilson in 1895, sold to Russia in 1910
SY Maha Chakri (1892), magnificent ship for the King of Siam, Rama V
CS Norseman (1892) Transatlantic cable-laying ship, scrapped in 1925
RSY Valhalla (1892) a steam yacht built for Joseph Laycock, later owned by James Lindsay, 26th Earl of Crawford 
SS Vala (1893) for Salvesen & Co, one of the first ships with a bronze propeller
SS Vina (1893) sister ship to SS Vala, purchased in 1944 by the Ministry of War for target practice (still extant - known as the Brancaster Wreck)
SS Drumrock (c.1894) an early steel hulled ship sold to F. Laeisz in 1899, sank near Vancouver in 1927
SS Royal Forth (c.1895) 3000 ton four-master sold to Schmidt of Hamburg around 1905 renamed Henriette. Passed to Italy in 1919. Broken 1924
SY Gunilda (1897) for William L. Harkness, sank in Lake Superior in 1911 (well preserved in water)
SY Amélia IV (1900) for the King of Portugal
SY Rosabelle (1902) for Theodore Pim, later requisitioned by the Admiralty and sunk by U-374 in December 1941
SS Vienna (1903) for the Currie Line
SS Palmella (1920) part of the re-equipping of the Ellerman Wilson Line who had heavy losses in the First World War
SY København for the Danish government (1921) (the largest sail ship ever built in Britain) lost at sea 1928
SMY Naz Perwer (1923) a beautiful steam yacht for Prince Youssouf Kamal of Egypt
SS Vyner Brooke (1928) for the King of Sarawak, named after Sir Charles Vyner Brooke
Brigantine Mercator for the Belgian government (the final ship, completed 1934), now a museum ship at Ostend

References

Defunct shipbuilding companies of Scotland